Cankurtaran is an indefinitely closed railway station on the Istanbul suburban, in Istanbul, Turkey. It is located in the neighborhood of Cankurtaran in the historic peninsula of İstanbul. The station is located on Şadırvan Street. Cankurtaran is just a block north of Kennedy Boulevard, along with the shoreline and a few blocks south of the Hagia Sophia and the Imperial Gate to the Topkapı Palace. The station was built in 1955 by the Turkish State Railways to be used by commuter trains operating between Sirkeci and Halkalı.

Cankurtaran was indefinitely closed in 2013 due to the rehabilitation and construction of the new Marmaray line.

Places of interest
The Ahırkapı Lighthouse, a historical lighthouse that is still in use, is in walking distance on the Kennedy Avenue at the coast of Marmara Sea.

References

External links
 İstanbul-Halkalı Line Timetables - Westbound
 İstanbul-Halkalı Line Timetables - Eastbound

Fatih
Railway stations in Istanbul Province
Railway stations opened in 1872
Railway stations closed in 2013
1872 establishments in the Ottoman Empire
2013 disestablishments in Turkey
Defunct railway stations in Turkey